Alloeocarpa is a genus of ascidian tunicates in the family Styelidae.

Species

Species within the genus Alloeocarpa include:
 Alloeocarpa aequatorialis Millar, 1953 
 Alloeocarpa affinis Bovien, 1921 
 Alloeocarpa bacca Ärnbäck, 1929 
 Alloeocarpa bigyna Monniot, 1978 
 Alloeocarpa bridgesi Michaelsen, 1900 
 Alloeocarpa capensis Hartmeyer, 1912 
 Alloeocarpa incrustans (Herdman, 1886) 
 Alloeocarpa loculosa C. Monniot, 1974 
 Alloeocarpa minuta Brewin, 1951

Species names currently considered to be synonyms:
 Alloeocarpa emilionis Michaelsen, 1900: synonym of Alloeocarpa incrustans (Herdman, 1886) 
 Alloeocarpa hupferi Michaelsen, 1904: synonym of Distomus hupferi (Michaelsen, 1904) 
 Alloeocarpa intermedia Michaelsen, 1900: synonym of Alloeocarpa incrustans (Herdman, 1886) 
 Alloeocarpa rudentiformis Sluiter, 1915: synonym of Distomus rudentiformis (Sluiter, 1915) 
 Alloeocarpa similis (Sluiter, 1904): synonym of Symplegma brakenhielmi (Michaelsen, 1904) 
 Alloeocarpa zschaui Michaelsen, 1900: synonym of Alloeocarpa incrustans (Herdman, 1886)

References

Stolidobranchia
Tunicate genera